= Dhruti =

2026 Indian Kannada language film

- Poster
- Directed by: Jagadish M
- Written by: Jagadish M
- Produced by: Jagadish M
- Starring: Prashanth Soppimath; Anchal Gowdra
- Cinematography: Pradeep Gandhi
- Edited by: Shashank Muralidharan
- Music by: Prasanna Kumar M S
- Production company: Fiction Riders Studios
- Release date: 8 May 2026
- Country: India
- Language: Kannada

Dhruti is a 2026 Indian Kannada language film written, produced, and directed by Jagadish M. The film stars Prashanth Soppimath and Anchal Gowdra in the lead roles.

== Cast ==
- Prashanth Soppimath
- Anchal Gowdra

== Reception ==
Susmita Sameera of The Times of India said that "Overall, the film attempts to present a realistic and precise portrayal of fear, survival, and human response during unexpected violence, supported by an emotionally driven narrative and socially relevant theme." Y. Maheswara Reddy of the Bangalore Mirror said that "Audiences seeking entertainment might find this film a last resort." A. Sharadhaa of the Cinema Express said that "Despite its rough edges, Dhruti remains sincere in its purpose. The film may not fully realise all its ideas, but it leaves behind a question: In today's world, is being a good Samaritan worth the risk?"
